William Earl Tatum (born July 26, 1953) is a retired American professional basketball player from Mount Vernon, New York.  He was a 6'4½" (194 cm) 185 lb (84 kg) guard who played high school basketball at Mount Vernon, where he was selected large-school player of the year by the New York State Sportswriters Association in 1972, and collegiately at Marquette University.

Tatum was selected with the 4th pick of the second round in the 1976 NBA Draft by the Los Angeles Lakers. During the 1977 NBA playoffs, Tatum’s only postseason appearance, he averaged 13.6 points and 4.8 rebounds in 11 games, as the Lakers advanced past the Golden State Warriors before losing to the Portland Trail Blazers. He played for five teams in 4 years, his final season spent with the Cleveland Cavaliers in 1979–80.

See also
List of National Basketball Association players with most steals in a game

References

External links
NBA stats @ basketballreference.com
Recent photo of Earl Tatum @ legendsofbasketball.com

1953 births
Living people
African-American basketball players
All-American college men's basketball players
American men's basketball players
Basketball players from New York (state)
Boston Celtics players
Cleveland Cavaliers players
Detroit Pistons players
Indiana Pacers players
Los Angeles Lakers draft picks
Los Angeles Lakers players
Marquette Golden Eagles men's basketball players
Shooting guards
Sportspeople from Mount Vernon, New York
American expatriate basketball people in the Philippines
Philippine Basketball Association imports
Great Taste Coffee Makers players
21st-century African-American people
20th-century African-American sportspeople
Mount Vernon High School (New York) alumni